Istgah-e Rah Ahn Sabzevar (also Romanized as Īstgāh-e Rāh Āhn Sabzevār; also known as Īstgāh-e Sabzevār) is a village in Meshkan Rural District, Meshkan District, Khoshab County, Razavi Khorasan Province, Iran. At the 2006 census, its population was 41, in 11 families.

References 

Populated places in Khoshab County